Sonja Karadžić-Jovičević (born 22 May 1967) is a Bosnian Serb politician and doctor serving as the vice president of the National Assembly of Republika Srpska since 7 October 2018.

She is a member of the Serb Democratic Party, a party founded by her father Radovan Karadžić, the first president of Republika Srpska. In December 2020, High Representative Valentin Inzko, with the  help of Sonja Karadžić-Jovičević, succeeded in having a plaque honoring Radovan Karadžić removed after threatening Bosnian Serb leader and Presidency member Milorad Dodik with European Union sanctions if the plaque were not removed within six months.

References 

Living people
1967 births
People from Sarajevo
Serbs of Bosnia and Herzegovina
Bosnia and Herzegovina people of Montenegrin descent
Serb Democratic Party (Bosnia and Herzegovina) politicians